Claudius Dutriève (21 February 1891 – 21 September 1960) was a French weightlifter. He competed at the 1924 Summer Olympics and the 1928 Summer Olympics.

References

External links
 

1891 births
1960 deaths
French male weightlifters
Olympic weightlifters of France
Weightlifters at the 1924 Summer Olympics
Weightlifters at the 1928 Summer Olympics
Place of birth missing